Sun City Texas is a  age-restricted community located in Georgetown, Texas, a city 35 miles north of Austin off Interstate 35. It is part of the chain of Sun City communities started by Del Webb.

Del Webb, a publicly traded company when Sun City Texas was originally conceived and through the first several years of homebuilding, was later sold to PulteGroup. Residency is restricted to persons over age 55, or in the case of couples, one of which must be 55 years of age (except in the instance of guardianship and marriage).  Sun City Texas is made up predominately of single-family dwellings, but also has a small number of duplexes. For marketing purposes, near the new Sales Center there are a limited number of houses called the Explore Del Webb Program (each complete with a golf cart), which are used for providing low-cost overnight accommodations for prospects to "live the life" of Sun City for a few days. Total build-out is approved by Georgetown for approximately 10,550 homes, which equals a total of approximately 18,500 residents.

Activities
The community is generally oriented toward recent retirees. However, demographically, Sun City often is not the last home where someone will live after retirement, but rather it is the first home of retirement for "active adults" who actively play tennis, golf, dance, do yoga or participate in numerous activities and clubs. Over the years, the average age of residents has crept up to about 71.

Due to a change in state law initiated by the developer, it is legal to drive licensed "golf cars" on the streets in the development and the shopping areas and all activity centers throughout Sun City have special parking spaces for the golf cars.

There are three golf courses, a large central activity center (with a ballroom, meeting rooms, a library and business center), hobby facilities (including woodworking, computer lab, ceramics studio, dancing, and others), numerous pools, a lake for fishing, and many other recreational facilities. Three "satellite" activity centers are located across the development, each with a pool, aerobic and dance studios and many other facilities.  There are clubs for almost any interest such as an active nature club that takes advantage of the 14 miles of nature walks and special ecological features of the site.

The community's proximity to Southwestern University provides access to a variety of additional cultural activities. And the city of Austin is nearby providing a rich variety of urban activities, and the surrounding Hill Country region provides many opportunities for outdoor activities.

Voting strength
The project is located within the incorporated city limits of the City of Georgetown and receives water, wastewater, and electric service from the city.  Because of its size relative to the city, and the high growth rate within Sun City, the project has a significant impact on the local demographics. In elections, voter turnout in Sun City precincts typically exceeds 90 percent.  As a result of redistricting of council districts in 2011, two of the six single-member city council districts are composed predominantly of Sun City residents, and a former mayor, George Garver (as of 2011), is a Sun City resident and was a former city council member.

Target audiences
Although the community attracts residents from all over the country, it has proved especially popular with retirees from the Upper Midwest because of the lower cost of living and relatively mild climate, but residents from Dallas and Houston who want to live in the Texas Hill Country are also target prospects. The project name at the beginning of the development was "Sun City Georgetown", but the name was later changed to Sun City Texas because of its focus on attracting residents throughout the state. In 2007, Georgetown was named by Retirement Places Rated (Seventh Edition) as the "Best Place in America to Retire".

Golf courses
 Legacy Hills
 White Wing
 Cowan Creek

Notable residents
Murray Wier, a former college basketball All-American and National Basketball Association (NBA) player, was a resident of the retirement community.

Another resident is former Dallas Cowboys Hall-of-Fame football player Bob Lilly, the first player initiated into the Cowboys' Dallas Cowboys Ring of Honor (in 1975). Only nine players received the honor during the first three decades of the Cowboys' existence, making the Ring of Honor a coveted accolade.

References

External links

 Sun City Georgetown
 Sun City Texas Community website

Georgetown, Texas
Retirement communities